John Thomas O'Leary (February 12, 1929 – December 2, 1983) was an American football and basketball coach and college athletics administrator. He served as the head football coach at St. Mary of the Plains College in Dodge City, Kansas from 1960 to 1962, compiling a record of 8–18. O'Leary was also the athletic director at Colorado State University from 1974 to 1976 and the University of Central Florida (UCF) from 1976 to 1981.

Born and raised in Portsmouth, New Hampshire, O'Leary was a multi-sport star Portsmouth High School and captain of the All-New Hampshire football team in 1946. He began his college football career in 1948 at the University of Miami, playing halfback for head coach Andy Gustafson.  O'Leary served in the United States Army during the Korean War, later becoming a commissioned officer.  He began his coaching career while in the military, first as head football coach and assistant administrator of athletics at Fort Carson in El Paso County, Colorado in 1952 and then as football and track coach at Fort Devens in Massachusetts the following year.

In 1954, O'Leary was an assistant football coach at his alma mater, Portsmouth High School, before moving to New Hampshire Technical Institute—now known as NHTI, Concord's Community College—in Concord, New Hampshire to serve as athletic director and head basketball coach. After transferring from the University of New Hampshire, O'Leary resumed his college football career in 1956 at Colorado College in Colorado Springs, Colorado, playing quarterback for head coach Roy B. Robertson.  From 1957 to 1959, O'Leary was an assistant coach at Colorado College in football, basketball, baseball, and ice hockey, before he was named to the coaching staff at St. Mary of the Plains College in August 1959.

O'Leary died of a heart attack, on December 2, 1983, at the age of 54.

Head coaching record

College football

References

1929 births
1983 deaths
American football halfbacks
American football quarterbacks
Basketball coaches from New Hampshire
Colorado College Tigers baseball coaches
Colorado College Tigers football coaches
Colorado College Tigers football players
Colorado College Tigers men's basketball coaches
Colorado College Tigers men's ice hockey coaches
Colorado State Rams athletic directors
Miami Hurricanes football players
Tulane Green Wave football coaches
UCF Knights athletic directors
St. Mary of the Plains Cavaliers football coaches
High school football coaches in New Hampshire
Junior college men's basketball coaches in the United States
United States Army personnel of the Korean War
United States Army officers
University of Alabama alumni
University of New Hampshire alumni
People from Portsmouth, New Hampshire
Sportspeople from Rockingham County, New Hampshire
Players of American football from New Hampshire